is the fourth studio album by Japanese J-pop singer and songwriter Maki Ohguro. It was released on 9 November 1994 under B-Gram Records.

Album consist of four previously released singles, Anata Dake Mitsumeteru, Shiroi Graduation, Natsu ga Kuru and Eien no Yume ni Mukatte. All of these four singles become her big hits which sold more than 400,000 copies, except of Anata Dake Mitsumeteru and Natsu ga Kuru which sold more than million copies.

The album reached No. 1 in its first week on the Oricon chart. The album sold 1,583,000 copies. It's her the first album which reached million sold copies. It got rewarded with Gold disc by Recording Industry Association of Japan.

Track listing
All tracks arranged by Takeshi Hayama.

In media
Anata dake Mitsumeteru: ending theme for Anime television series Slam Dunk
Eien no Yume ni Mukatte: opening theme for Tokyo Broadcasting System Television program Count Down TV
Natsu ga Kuru: opening theme for Tokyo Broadcasting System Television program Count Down TV
Shiroi Graduation: commercial film song for company Xebio's Victoria

References

Being Inc. albums
Japanese-language albums
1994 albums
Maki Ohguro albums